Sina-1 is the first Iranian artificial satellite, launched at 6:52 UTC October 28, 2005 on board a Cosmos-3M Russian launch vehicle from the Plesetsk Cosmodrome. The rocket was also carrying a Russian military Mozhayets-5 satellite, a Chinese China-DMC, a British TopSat, a European Space Agency SSETI Express (Student Space Exploration and Technology Initiative-Express), a Norwegian nCube, a German UWE-1, and a Japanese XI-V. Sina-1 Satellite Catalog Number or USSPACECOM object number is 28893 .

In 2003, then-Defense Minister Admiral Ali Shamkhani announced that Iran would launch its first satellite on a locally produced launch vehicle within eighteen months. The plan was to develop a booster based on the Shahab-3 medium-range ballistic missile.

When difficulties arose with indigenous booster development, the Iranian Institute of Applied Research turned to the Omsk-based Russian company Polyot. Polyot provided the launch services aboard the Kosmos-3M rocket and also built the satellite itself. The costs of the satellite was sited as US$15 million.

The satellite
The Iranian Space Agency had for many years said they were on the verge of sending their first satellite into orbit, finally leading to the launch of Sina-1, a satellite for telecommunications and Earth-imaging research purposes.

The miniaturized 170-kilogram reconnaissance satellite was put into a sun-synchronous near-polar orbit and will image the surface with a 50 m (pan) with 50 km swath and 250 m resolution of MSS with 500 km swath resolution.

The future

Iran has plans for the construction of five more Iranian satellites of which three are scheduled to be launched over the next three years. In July 2005, Iran's Deputy Telecom Minister Ahmad Talebzadeh said that Iran's next satellite, Mesbah, is ready for launch.

Mesbah, similar to Sina-1, is a reconnaissance satellite which will be used to monitor natural phenomena on Iran's territory. This satellite will most likely be launched on an indigenous rocket.

Iranian officials were originally going to use the recently cancelled Shahab-4 missile to carry out the process of launching satellites into space. Instead, IRIS, an advanced model of the Ghadr-110 IRBM missile, will be used.

In January 2005, Iran and a Russian firm sealed a $132 million deal to build a telecommunication satellite called Zohreh (Venus). The launch of Zohreh is planned in the next two years.

See also

 Al-Ta'ir
 Omid, Iranian satellite launched in February 2009 by an Iranian rocket Safir.
 Iranian Space Agency
 Safir

Sources
 Iran's No Longer Moscow's Satellite - Kommersant

References

External links
 Real Time Tracking of Sina-1

Reconnaissance satellites of Iran
Satellites orbiting Earth
Spacecraft launched in 2005
First artificial satellites of a country